Alex Dominguez may refer to:

Alex Dominguez (politician) (born 1970), Texas politician 
Álex Domínguez (born 1998), Spanish footballer
Alexander Domínguez (born 1987), Ecuadorian footballer

See also
 Aleix Domínguez